Below are the rosters for the EFA European Under-16 Football Championship 1994 tournament in Republic of Ireland.

Group A

Head coach: Mexhit Haxhiu 
Ass. coach: Agim Medja

Head coach:

Head coach: Yuri Pyshnik

Head coach: Juan Santisteban

Group B

Head coach:Rudolf Novak

Head coach:

Head coach:Turlough O'Connor

Head coach:Rui Cacador

Group C

Head coach:Poul Erik Bech

Head coach: Bernd Stöber

Head coach:

Head coach:

Group D

Head coach:

Head coach:

Head coach: Bora Ozturk

Head coach: Volodymyr Kyianchenko

References

UEFA European Under-17 Championship squads